Ian Cook is a contemporary British artist who makes art with radio controlled cars, actual car tyres and toy car wheel. He operates under the corporate name 'PopbangColour'.

Cook became a car enthusiast at an early age and combined his passions of cars, toys and art to create complex and dynamic artworks.

Early life
Cook studied at Langley Secondary School, Solihull from 1994 to 1999. He then went to Sutton Coldfield College to study a BTEC National Diploma for Illustration. Finally, he attended Winchester School of Art for Fine art where he received a first class BA Honours degree for painting.
He studied at the Latvian art academy in Riga, Latvia, and it was there that he started employing vehicles in his works. Whilst in Latvia he produced photography and collected merchandise in regards to Range Rover.

For a short period he became a lecturer in fine art and visual studies at Sutton Coldfield College's design centre.

Work
To create his unique artworks, Cook spoons acrylic paint and ink onto large 2.5 x 1.5-metre Fabriano Paper and drives the radio-controlled cars over the canvas in short bursts to create the 'brush strokes'. He also uses full-size car tyres for large blocks of colour and small toy car wheels for different prints and textures.

He first began using this artwork style when one Christmas he received a radio-controlled Lightning McQueen and was told "not to take it down the studio and not to get paint on it". With his 'lightbulb' moment Ian took a large canvas, placed it on the floor, and applied some paint to a toy car. Cook has also used a large truck to create the larger solid lines.

Cook creates his artworks in his studio, at Fargo Village, Coventry, where he is one of the artists in residence. Cook has been seen creating in public places across the United Kingdom for shows or promotions, including Goodwood Festival of Speed, Autosport International, Salon Privé and Britcar

Cook's artwork has been featured on Blue Peter, Top Gear, The One Show with Chris Evans and Jessie J and painted with Lewis Hamilton on Sky Sports F1.

In October 2008, Cook made a portrait of Formula 1 racing driver Lewis Hamilton the size of "two London double-decker buses", which was unveiled by Tower Bridge, London.

In March 2011, Cook featured on the ITV breakfast show Daybreak, where he created a portrait of Adrian Chiles and Christine Bleakley as well as the Daybreak logo.

Cook broke a Guinness World record in March 2015 for creating the world's largest glow-in-the-dark painting (207 sq. m)

References

External links
Youtube video showing Ian painting

British abstract artists
21st-century British painters
British male painters
Radio-controlled car personalities
Artists from Birmingham, West Midlands
1983 births
Living people
21st-century British male artists